Ornaldo Javier Claut  (born 8 June 1970 in Buenos Aires) is a retired Argentine football player who played for a number of clubs both in Argentina and Europe, including Club Atlético River Plate, Club Atlético Banfield and Villarreal CF.

See also
Football in Argentina
List of football clubs in Argentina

References

External links
 Statistics at FutbolXXI.com  
 Statistics at LFP.es 

1970 births
Living people
Footballers from Buenos Aires
Argentine footballers
Club Atlético River Plate footballers
Ferro Carril Oeste footballers
Al Ain FC players
Club Atlético Banfield footballers
Quilmes Atlético Club footballers
Club Atlético Tigre footballers
Villarreal CF players
FC Locarno players
Argentine Primera División players
Argentine expatriate footballers
Expatriate footballers in Spain
Expatriate footballers in Switzerland
Defensores de Belgrano footballers
Association football midfielders